Siniša Ninković (Serbian Cyrillic: Синиша Нинковић; born June 12, 1977) is a Serbian former footballer and manager who played in First League of Serbia and Montenegro, Second League of Serbia and Montenegro, Belgian Second Division, and the Canadian Soccer League.

Playing career

Club career
Ninković began his career in 1994 with Partizan Belgrade of the First League of FR Yugoslavia. After his stint in the top flight he featured primarily with clubs in the Second League of FR Yugoslavia. He had stints with Radnički Belgrade, Hajduk Belgrade, and played with C.S. Visé in the Belgian Second Division. In 1998, he returned to the First League with FK Železnik. Ninković won the Serbia and Montenegro Cup in 2002–03 with Sartid Smederevo under coach Milenko Kiković. In 2006, he went overseas to Canada to sign with Serbian White Eagles of the Canadian Soccer League. In his debut season he clinched the International Division title and secured a postseason berth. He featured in the CSL Championship finals against Italia Shooters, but suffered a 1-0 defeat.

International career
Ninković was a member of the Serbia national under-21 football team from 1999–2000 where he featured along the likes of Milivoje Ćirković, Milan Obradović and Ivica Iliev.

Coaching career
In 2007, he was named as the successor to Dušan Belić as head coach of the Serbian White Eagles. He was selected as the head coach for the International Division squad for the CSL All-Star match. Near the conclusion of the season he was replaced by Branko Pavlović due to disagreements with the club's management.

Honours

Player
Sartid Smederevo
Serbia and Montenegro Cup: 2002–03

Serbian White Eagles
Canadian Soccer League International Division: 2006

Manager
Serbian White Eagles
Canadian Soccer League International Division: 2007

References 

1977 births
Living people
Footballers from Belgrade
Serbian footballers
Serbian football managers
Serbia and Montenegro under-21 international footballers
FK Radnički Beograd players
FK Hajduk Beograd players
C.S. Visé players
FK Železnik players
FK Smederevo players
Serbian White Eagles FC players
First League of Serbia and Montenegro players
Challenger Pro League players
Canadian Soccer League (1998–present) players
Serbian White Eagles FC managers
Canadian Soccer League (1998–present) managers
Association football defenders